The first semifinal of the 2014 Speedway European Championship qualification took place in Daugavpils, Latvia, on 17 May 2014, as a replacement for a previously planned event in Rivne, Ukraine.

Semifinal 1 
 17 May 2014
  Daugavpils
 Spīdveja centrs (Length: 373m)
 References

Semifinal 2 
 17 May 2014
  Krsko
 Matija Gubec Stadium (Length: 387m)
 References

Semifinal 3 
 25 May 2014
  Žarnovica
 Speedwaystadium (Length: 400m)
 References 

The final order for placings 4–8 was decided by the jury, after heavy rain forced the cancellation of the run-off.

SEC Challenge 
 8 June 2014
  Debrecen
 Speedway Stadium (Length: 398m)
 References

See also 
 Motorcycle Speedway
 2014 Speedway European Championship

References 

Speedway European Championship
European Championship qualification
Qualification for sports events